Roc'h Trevezel is the second peak of the Breton part of the Armorican Massif in the Monts d'Arrée.
Just like the Signal of Toussaines, it reaches  in altitude.
It is located in the commune of Plounéour-Ménez, near Roc'h Ruz, the highest point of the Monts d'Arrée in Brittany.

Roc'h Trevezel is the highest peak on the Paris–Brest–Paris bicycle route.

References

External links

 Statistics on the mountains of Brittany

Mountains of Brittany